Harry Edward "Lefty" Schaeffer (June 23, 1924 – July 12, 2008) was an American professional baseball pitcher who appeared in five games in Major League Baseball (MLB) for the  New York Yankees. He served in the United States Navy during World War II and attended the East Stroudsburg University of Pennsylvania.

Schaeffer's nine-year professional career lasted from 1946 through 1954. In his midsummer 1952 trial, the Yankees gave him two opportunities as a starting pitcher. In his MLB debut July 28, he started against the last-place Detroit Tigers and went five innings, allowing five runs, four of them earned. He took the loss for his only MLB decision. 
In five MLB games, he worked 17 innings, allowing 18 hits and 18 bases on balls with 15 strikeouts. He compiled a 5.29 career earned run average to go along with his 0–1 won–lost record. He posted an 84–67 record in minor league baseball.

References

External links

1924 births
2008 deaths
United States Navy personnel of World War II
Amsterdam Rugmakers players
Baseball players from Pennsylvania
Beaumont Roughnecks players
East Stroudsburg Warriors baseball players
Kansas City Blues (baseball) players
Major League Baseball pitchers
Manchester Yankees players
Newark Bears (IL) players
New York Yankees players
Oakland Oaks (baseball) players
People from Shillington, Pennsylvania
Sportspeople from Reading, Pennsylvania
Stroudsburg Poconos players
Toledo Sox players
Toronto Maple Leafs (International League) players